Ocularia subcineracea is a species of beetle in the family Cerambycidae. It was described by Stephan von Breuning in 1968.

References

Oculariini
Beetles described in 1968
Taxa named by Stephan von Breuning (entomologist)